Mike Kleiber (born 4 February 1993) is a Swiss footballer who plays for Young Fellows Juventus in the Swiss Challenge League.

Career

Young Fellows Juventus
On 25 January 2019, Kleiber signed with  Young Fellows Juventus.

References

External links
 

Swiss men's footballers
Swiss Super League players
1993 births
Living people
FC Zürich players
Association football midfielders
FC Rapperswil-Jona players